The Ultimate Prime Circle is a 2010 compilation album by David Gresham Records released without the knowledge, consent or support of South African rock band Prime Circle. The album contains tracks from the band's first two albums, recorded while the band was under contract. The band has never endorsed, marketed or sold the album through their merchandise division.

In the end the release didn't manage to steal any of the thunder of the band's fourth album, which achieved gold sales status in just 9 days. David Gresham Records has not announced official sales numbers or sales accreditation for The Ultimate Prime Circle, making this unofficial album the only Prime Circle branded album to date to not be certified gold or platinum.

Track listing 

Live This Life
Hello
As Long As I Am Here
My Inspiration
Miracle
Moments
The Same Goes For You
Let Me Go
New Phase
Can't Stop The Rain
Shed My Skin
Maybe Wrong
The Way It Could Be
Daydreamer
Hello (Acoustic)

2010 compilation albums
Prime Circle albums